Katja Suding (born 30 December 1975, in Vechta) is a German politician of the Free Democratic Party (FDP) was a member of the German Bundestag from 2017 to 2021. She served as chairwoman of her party's parliamentary group in the Hamburgische Bürgerschaft from 2010 until 2017.

Early life and education 
Suding grew up in Vechta. During highschool, she spent a year in Logan, Utah in 1993.

Suding studied political science and romance studies at the University of Münster and graduated in 2003 as Magistra Artium. Already during her studies, she moved to Hamburg in 1999. After six years as freelance PR consultant, Suding moved to the Hamburg office of international consulting firm Edelman in 2011, where she advised Diageo.

Political career

Career in state politics
Suding has been a member of the FDP since 2006. Since 2008, she has been a member of the Hamburg state executive board of the party. At the 2009 German federal election she stood unsuccessfully in Hamburg-Altona. In December 2010, she was nominated as the leading candidate of the FDP to the 2011 Hamburg state election. The party had failed to gain any seats in the 2004 and 2008 elections, and the polls in 2010 predicted between three and four percent. Under Suding's leadership, the FDP managed a comeback to the Bürgerschaft with 6.7% of the votes, making it the best result since 1974 and giving them nine of the 121 seats. Suding herself was elected to the constituency of Blankenese. After the state elections, her party's parliamentary group elected her as its chairwoman. In addition, she served as a member of the Budget Committee and the Audit Committee.

At the national party convention of the FDP in April 2011 in Rostock, Suding was for the first time elected as a member of the federal executive board of the party under the leadership of chairman Philipp Rösler. In 2015, she was elected the party's deputy chairperson (alongside Wolfgang Kubicki and Marie-Agnes Strack-Zimmermann), this time under the leadership of chairman Christian Lindner.

Suding was a FDP delegate to the Federal Convention for the purpose of electing the President of Germany in 2012 and 2017. In 2016, she announced that she would leave state politics and instead run for a parliamentary seat in the 2017 national elections.

Member of the German Bundestag, 2017–2021
Suding was a member of the German Bundestag from September 2017. She served as one of six deputy chairpersons of the FDP parliamentary group under the leadership of its chairman Christian Lindner, where she oversaw the group's activities on education policy. She also served as deputy chairwoman of the German-Italian Parliamentary Friendship Group.

In the (unsuccessful) negotiations to form a coalition government with the Christian Democrats – both the Christian Democratic Union (CDU) and the Christian Social Union in Bavaria (CSU) – and the Green Party following the elections, she was part of the FDP delegation.

In September 2020, Suding announced that she would not stand in the 2021 federal elections but instead resign from active politics by the end of the parliamentary term.

Life after politics
Since 2022, Suding has been a senior advisor to Rud Pedersen Public Affairs.

Other activities
 Alexander Otto Sportstiftung, Member of the Advisory Board
 Übersee Club, Member of the Board of Trustees

Personal life
Suding is married and the mother of two sons. The family lived in Groß Flottbek.

In 2012, Suding separated from her husband Christian. Since 2015, she has been in a relationship with former professional tennis player Udo Riglewski.

References

External links 

 Personal website
 Facebook site

1975 births
Living people
Members of the Bundestag for Hamburg
Female members of the Bundestag
Women members of State Parliaments in Germany
Members of the Hamburg Parliament
University of Münster alumni
People from Vechta
21st-century German women politicians
Members of the Bundestag 2017–2021
Members of the Bundestag for the Free Democratic Party (Germany)